The San Juan Teacherage is a teacherage near Sherman, New Mexico.  It was built in 1923 and was listed on the National Register of Historic Places in 1988.

It is a single file plan building built in 1923 on a raised foundation (likely made of concrete), with stuccoed walls and a corrugated metal hipped roof in Vernacular New Mexico style.

It was built by homesteader John Entzminger for schoolteachers at the San Juan school.  Its construction was funded by the state, and it was built on land donated by Alfred Perrault, son of settler George Perrault.  According to its National Register nomination, "Alfred was continuing a family tradition of supporting local education (see George Perrault House, #3, discussion) and this explains the location of the teachers residence here away from the school in San Juan."

It was deemed "a good, unmodified example of the New Mexico Vernacular type in the early twentieth century. The stuccoed walls of the building, its single file
plan and corrugated metal hipped roof, are similar to most New Mexico Vernacular residences in the valley, although the raised foundation is an Anglo-American element."

It was listed on the National Register as part of a 1988 study of historic resources in the Mimbres Valley of Grant County.

References

		
National Register of Historic Places in Grant County, New Mexico
Buildings and structures completed in 1923
Teacherages